Noel Fernando Salas (born May 30, 1985) is a Mexican professional baseball pitcher for the Olmecas de Tabasco of the Mexican League. He made his major league debut in 2010. He previously played in Major League Baseball (MLB) for the St. Louis Cardinals, Los Angeles Angels of Anaheim / Los Angeles Angels, New York Mets, Arizona Diamondbacks and Philadelphia Phillies.

Early life
Fernando Salas was born and raised in Huatabampo, Mexico. Growing up he never thought about playing in the American Major Leagues, instead being an avid fan of Mexican League baseball. Said Salas: "There is a lot of money to stay in Mexican League. A lot of players in Mexican League have a chance, (at American baseball) but they want a lot of money." Although he watched little if any American baseball—the only game he can remember watching is the 1993 World Series between the Toronto Blue Jays and Philadelphia Phillies—he had a dream of proving he was good enough to play in the major leagues.

Professional career

Saltillo Saraperos
Salas first pitched professionally at age 20 when he was signed by the Saltillo Saraperos of the Mexican League. There his pitching coach was Sid Monge a veteran of ten years in American Major League baseball as a player and a coach in the St. Louis Cardinals minor league system. According to Salas, Monge was the reason he is now playing in the major leagues: "He pushed me. He said 'You can go to America'. He believed in me."  Representatives from other major league teams took interest in Salas as well, with scouts from the Chicago Cubs, Kansas City Royals, Detroit Tigers and the Cardinals watching Salas pitch in the 2006 Mexican League playoffs.

St. Louis Cardinals

The Cardinals were impressed enough to buy Salas' contract from Saltillo in February 2007. He reported for spring training in Jupiter, Florida, remaining there for the entire season with the Cardinals High-A ball affiliate Palm Beach Cardinals. He advanced through the minor league system, playing for the Double-A Springfield Cardinals in 2008 and Triple-A Memphis Redbirds for the 2009 season. Salas began 2010 in Memphis but was called up to the majors for the first time on May 27, 2010. He made his major league debut the next day, pitching one scoreless inning.

In 2011, he replaced Ryan Franklin as the Cardinals' closer, earning 24 saves in 68 appearances with a 2.28 ERA. Salas began the 2012 season with St. Louis, but after going 0–3 with a 6.32 ERA in 18 games, he was optioned to Triple-A Memphis. It was later learned that Salas had been hampered by a kidney stone, and once that medical situation passed he returned to St. Louis later in the season. He finished the 2012 season with a record of 1–4, 60 strikeouts, and a 4.30 ERA.

Los Angeles Angels of Anaheim / Los Angeles Angels

On November 22, 2013, he was traded along with David Freese to the Los Angeles Angels of Anaheim for Peter Bourjos and Randal Grichuk.

New York Mets

On August 31, the Angels traded Salas to the New York Mets for minor league pitcher Erik Manoah. He debuted for the club on September 1, pitching a scoreless inning against the Miami Marlins at Citi Field. On February 15, 2017, Salas signed a one-year contract with the Mets. On his thirty-second birthday, Salas recorded his first Major League hit off of Carlos Torres of the Milwaukee Brewers at Citi Field. He was designated for assignment on August 11, 2017. 
He was released by the Mets on August 16, 2017.

Second stint with the Los Angeles Angels
On August 19, 2017, Salas signed a minor league contract with the Los Angeles Angels.

Arizona Diamondbacks
On January 22, 2018, Salas signed a minor league deal with the Arizona Diamondbacks. In 44 games for Arizona, he was 4–4 with a 4.50 ERA in 40 innings. On July 6, 2018, Salas was designated for assignment. He was released on July 9, 2018.

Atlanta Braves
On July 16, 2018, Salas signed a minor league deal with the Atlanta Braves. He was released on August 11, 2018.

Acereros de Monclova
On March 6, 2019, Salas signed with the Acereros de Monclova of the Mexican League.

Philadelphia Phillies
On June 7, 2019, Salas signed a minor league deal with the Philadelphia Phillies and was assigned to the Lehigh Valley IronPigs. On June 24, his contract was selected by the Phillies. He was designated for assignment on June 28 after appearing in just one game. Salas has his contract selected by the Phillies on July 18, 2019. He was once again designated for assignment on July 21, after the signing of Drew Smyly, and outrighted on July 23. In 2019 with the Class AAA Lehigh Valley IronPigs he was 1–1 with a 4.63 ERA in 18 relief appearances (23.1 innings), and with the Phillies he pitched 2.2 innings in which he gave up two runs. He elected free agency on October 1. After the 2019 season, he played for Naranjeros de Hermosillo of the Mexican Pacific League(LVMP).

Acereros de Monclova (second stint)
On February 28, 2020, Salas signed with the Acereros de Monclova of the Mexican League. In 2020, he did not play a game because of the cancellation of the Mexican League season due to the COVID-19 pandemic.
After the 2020 season, he played for Naranjeros of the LVMP. He has also played for Mexico in the 2021 Caribbean Series.

Olmecas de Tabasco
On March 30, 2021, Salas was traded to the Olmecas de Tabasco of the Mexican League.

Personal life
Salas and his girlfriend, Daniela, are parents of a son, Fernando, born during 2012 spring training. He is being raised in Mexico. It is not a situation to Salas' liking: "Other Latin players have a lot of family in America. For me, it didn't happen. It's a little difficult because my family doesn't know any English. But they know it's work. They know it's a profession." and "I love the opportunity. I want to do everything I can to stay here."

Awards and honors
2006 Mexican League mid-season All-Star
2008 Texas League mid-season Al-Star
2008 Futures Game selection
2008 Texas League post-season All-Star
2008 Baseball America Double-A All-Star
2010 PCL Pitcher of the Week
2010 PCL mid-season All-Star
2010 MLB.com Organization All-Star
2011 World Series champion

References

External links

1985 births
Living people
Acereros de Monclova players
Arizona Diamondbacks players
Baseball players from Sonora
Gulf Coast Cardinals players
Gwinnett Stripers players
Inland Empire 66ers of San Bernardino players
Lehigh Valley IronPigs players
Los Angeles Angels players
Major League Baseball pitchers
Major League Baseball players from Mexico
Memphis Redbirds players
Mexican expatriate baseball players in the United States
Mexican League baseball pitchers
Naranjeros de Hermosillo players
National baseball team players
New York Mets players
Olmecas de Tabasco players
Palm Beach Cardinals players
People from Huatabampo
Philadelphia Phillies players
Salt Lake Bees players
Saraperos de Saltillo players
Springfield Cardinals players
St. Louis Cardinals players
Venados de Mazatlán players
2013 World Baseball Classic players
2017 World Baseball Classic players
2019 WBSC Premier12 players
Baseball players at the 2020 Summer Olympics
Olympic baseball players of Mexico